Ora et labora (Pray and work) is an album by Croatian singer Marko Perković Thompson. It was released on April 10, 2013.

All songs on the album were written by Marko Perković and Tiho Orlić.

Themes
The album featured heavy Christian and Catholic themes, as well as Croatian patriotic elements, like most of Thompson's.  The title of the album serves as the core theme that is reiterated in both the first ("Sokolov krik") and last ("Put u raj") song.  Many songs are directed at/offer prayers to God, such as "Maranatha" ("Maranatha"), "Uvijek vjerni tebi" ("Always Faithful to You").  Other songs include historical elements about Croatia, such as "Bosna" ("Bosnia") and "Bog i Hrvati" ("God and the Croats") which are also the two longest songs on the album.  Thompson is also critical of so-called "pro-Yugoslavian communist sentiments" in modern-day Croatia, even referencing Stjepan Radić's famous speech on November 24, 1918 about the Croatian people being led "into the fog like geese."

Reception
The album received instant commercial success, topping charts in Croatia as well as other countries such as Germany, Sweden and Austria.

Tracks

References

Thompson (band) albums
2013 albums